RS Group plc (formerly Electrocomponents plc) is a distributor of industrial and electronics products based in London, England. It is listed on the London Stock Exchange and is a constituent of the FTSE 100 Index.

History

The company was founded by J.H. Waring and P.M. Sebestyen as Radiospares in London in 1937. It supplied radio repair shops with spare parts – replacement electronic components and mechanical components for radio receivers and transmitters. When television sets became popular, the company added television parts to their product list. By the end of the Second World War, the company had evolved into a large national distribution company. In 1954, the founders of Radiospares expanded the company's focus from shops and home users to the industrial sector and began selling electronic components to manufacturers.

The company was first listed on the London Stock Exchange as Electrocomponents in 1967. It opened a distribution centre at Corby in Northamptonshire in 1984, introduced a CD-ROM catalogue and opened a distribution centre in Nuneaton in Warwickshire in 1995, launched its own E-commerce web site in 1998 and acquired Allied Electronics, a US-based distributor, in 1999. 

In 2010, its two main operating companies, RS Components and Allied Electronics, launched free-to-use PCB layout software, DesignSpark PCB. Then in 2012, RS Components and Allied Electronics became two of the main manufacturers and distributors for the Raspberry Pi.

In March 2022, Electrocomponents plc announced that it would change is name to RS Group plc in early May 2022.

Operations
RS Group plc is an omni-channel provider of products and services for designers, builders and maintainers of industrial equipment and operations, serving over 1 million customers in more than 80 countries. The company distributes over 600,000 products, including electronic components, electrical, automation and control, and test and measurement equipment, and engineering tools and consumables, sourced from 2,500 suppliers. The company trades under the brands:
 RS - operations across the world
 Allied Electronics - operations in North America
 OKdo - Global tech company focused on SBC and IoT, serving hobbyists, entrepreneurs, industrial designers and resellers

Awards
 2017 - Electrocomponents won Turnaround of the Year Award at the PLC Awards 2016
 2014 - Electrocomponents was named UKTI Digital Business of the Year at the 2014 National Business Awards
 2012 - Electrocomponents was presented the Queen's Award for Enterprise for continuous achievement in international trade

References

Electronics companies of the United Kingdom
Companies based in London
Electronics companies established in 1937
Companies listed on the London Stock Exchange
Electronic component distributors